The Samsung E1200 (also known as Samsung Pusha and Samsung Keystone 2) is a mobile phone made by Samsung.
This phone was released in 2012 through Tesco in the UK. It was discontinued in 2015 when the Samsung Guru FM E1202 was released as its successor.

Hardware 
The case of the Samsung GT-E1200 is made of two pieces of plastic, and the back of the phone has a special finish. The buttons are rubberized and dust-proof, including the power button, which also acts as a call hang-up button. The phone features a TFT LCD display capable of displaying 65,536 colors and a keyboard which has a five-way control button. The device has physical dimensions of 108 x 45 x 13.5 mm and weighs 65 grams.

References

Mobile phones introduced in 2012
Samsung mobile phones